Carboxypeptidase Taq is an enzyme. This enzyme catalyses the following chemical reaction

 Release of a C-terminal amino acid with broad specificity, except for -Pro

This 56-kDa enzyme is isolated from Thermus aquaticus.

References

External links 
 

EC 3.4.17